Jaroslav Veselý (born 12 February 1937) is a Czech former sports shooter. He competed in the 50 metre pistol event at the 1968 Summer Olympics.

References

1937 births
Living people
Czech male sport shooters
Olympic shooters of Czechoslovakia
Shooters at the 1968 Summer Olympics
Sportspeople from Plzeň